Sleeping Partner is a 2020 Indian Hindi-language drama film that sheds light on domestic violence and marital rape. Starring Divya Dutta and Sanjay Kapoor, this film is a Flipkart Video Original and part of an anthology of seven short films titled Zindagi inShort produced by Guneet Monga of Sikhya Entertainment. The film was released on 19 February 2020.

Cast 
 Divya Dutta as Beena
 Sanjay Kapoor as Sahay
 Jitin Gulati as Ravish

Reception 
Pratishruti Ganguly of Firstpost gave a mixed review stating "Despite the superb acting though, one may find Sleeping Partner a tad too melodramatic and Bollywood-ised, especially in the end." In contrast, Ruchi Kaushal of Hindustan Times and Nandini Ramanath of Scroll.in gave a positive note and also praised Divya Dutta's characterisation, with the former stating that "It’s enough to leave you impressed not just with Divya’s character arc but also how a woman finds courage inside herself." and the latter wrote "The feminist lite treatment ensures a conclusion that nobody saw coming. Yet, Dutta is affecting as the bruised wife, and Sanjay Kapoor is turning out to be a fine cameo artist in small but well-written parts." Rahul Desai of Film Companion noted "The film subverts the extramarital template and pitches a woman against the general arrogance of mankind: a tightrope walk that doesn’t fall prey to the woke, kitchen-sink-brand feminism expected from storytellers these days."

References

External links 
 Zindagi inShort on Flipkart

2020s Hindi-language films
Indian short films
2020 short films
2020 drama films
2020 films